2 Samuel 1 is the first chapter of the Second Book of Samuel in the Old Testament of the Christian Bible or the second part of Books of Samuel in the Hebrew Bible. According to Jewish tradition  the book was attributed to the prophet Samuel, with additions by the prophets Gad and Nathan, but modern scholars view it as a composition of a number of independent texts of various ages from c. 630–540 BCE. This chapter contains the account of David mourning the death of Saul and his sons, especially Jonathan. This is within a section comprising 1 Samuel 16 to 2 Samuel 5 which records the rise of David as the king of Israel.

Text
This chapter was originally written in the Hebrew language. It is divided into 27 verses.

Textual witnesses
Some early manuscripts containing the text of this chapter in Hebrew are of the Masoretic Text tradition, which includes the Codex Cairensis (895), Aleppo Codex (10th century), and Codex Leningradensis (1008). Fragments containing parts of this chapter in Hebrew were found among the Dead Sea Scrolls including 4Q51 (4QSam; 100–50 BCE) with extant verses 4–5, 10–13.

Extant ancient manuscripts of a translation into Koine Greek known as the Septuagint (originally was made in the last few centuries BCE) include Codex Vaticanus (B; B; 4th century) and Codex Alexandrinus (A; A; 5th century).

Old Testament references
: ,

Places 

Ashkelon
Gath
Mount Gilboa
Ziklag

Saul's death was reported to David (1:1–16)
This chapter is a conclusion to the narrative about Saul and David.
It opened with an Amalekite reporting to David about Saul's death which is an entirely different account to the one in 1 Samuel 31:3–5, because this messenger claimed he killed Saul on the dying king's request and as proof he presented the king's crown and armlet to David. The most likely explanation of the discrepancy is that the Amalekite was lying in order to gain favor with David. He came with 'clothes torn and dirt on his head' to show signs of grief, this could have been contrived to give authenticity to his account, as it is more probable that he stumbled on Saul's body when he was searching for plunders in Mount Gilboa, so he immediately stripped him of his crown and armlet, then saw in this an opportunity to get rewards from the next king. However, the messenger describes himself as 'a resident alien' (gēr), who was bound by the laws of his adopted community (Leviticus 24:22), so his disregard for the sanctity of 'the LORD'S anointed' should be punished by death. This narrative confirms once again David's respect for YHWH's anointed, and also exonerates David entirely of the events leading to his succession, that David came innocently to be in possession of Saul's crown and armlet.

Verses 1–2
 Now it came to pass after the death of Saul, when David had returned from the slaughter of the Amalekites, and David had stayed two days in Ziklag,  on the third day, behold, it happened that a man came from Saul’s camp with his clothes torn and dust on his head. So it was, when he came to David, that he fell to the ground and prostrated himself.
"Ziklag": a city in the Negev (meaning "south", that is, in the southern area of Judah) which had been given to David by Achish son of Maoch, king of Gath, and for more than a year was used by David as a base from which he conducted military expeditions (1 Samuel 27:5–12). 1 Samuel 30:1–19 recorded that Ziklag was destroyed by the Amalekites while Saul fought the Philistines, so David and his men pursued and slaughtered the attackers as noted in this verse.
"Clothes torn and dust on his head": outward expressions of grief, a common response to tragic news in the ancient Near East.

David mourned Saul and Jonathan (1:17–27)
The lament in this section can be attributed to David himself with a very personal expression of grief over the loss of Jonathan. The poem was preserved in an anthology known as the Book of Jashar (cf. Joshua 10:12–13; 1 Kings 8:12–13). It has a kind of refrain 'how the mighty have fallen', occurring in three places (verses 19, 25, 27), dividing the poem into sections (19–24, 25–27) and forming an inclusio bracketing the beginning and the ending. After stating that Israel's 'glory' has fallen, the poet wishes that the news be kept from the cities of the Philistines to prevent their exultation over Judah (verse 20), followed by curses on Mount Gilboa (verse 21), the scene of defeat, condemning it to barrenness. Then, David extols Saul and Jonathan (verses 22–24) as heroes who persevered in battle (verse 22), were strong and swift (verse 23) and joined in death as father and son (verse 23). He called the women of Israel to mourn Saul, who had brought them prosperity and luxury (verse 24). David specially vents his personal grief for Jonathan (verses 25b–26), and the word 'love' echoes once again the covenant of friendship between the two, before the final refrain in verse 27.

Verse 26
I am distressed for you, my brother Jonathan;
You have been very pleasant to me;
Your love to me was wonderful,
Surpassing the love of women.
"Surpassing the love of women": Targum renders as "more than the love of two women,'' which is David's two wives, Ahinoam and Abigail.

See also

Related Bible parts: 1 Samuel 27, 1 Samuel 31, 1 Samuel 16, 2 Samuel 2, 1 Chronicles 10

Notes

References

Sources

Commentaries on Samuel

General

External links
 Jewish translations:
 Samuel II - II Samuel - Chapter 1 (Judaica Press). Hebrew text and English translation [with Rashi's commentary] at Chabad.org
 Christian translations:
 Online Bible at GospelHall.org (ESV, KJV, Darby, American Standard Version, Bible in Basic English)
 2 Samuel chapter 1. Bible Gateway

01